Red Robin is a name that has been used by several fictional superheroes appearing in American comic books published by DC Comics. The identity was first used in the future timeline of the 1996 miniseries Kingdom Come, where a middle-aged Dick Grayson reclaims the Robin mantle and becomes Red Robin. His uniform is closer to Batman's in design than any previous Robin uniform. Red Robin then reappeared in promotional material for the DC Countdown miniseries; eventually, it was revealed that this Red Robin was not Dick Grayson, but rather Jason Todd, who appeared under the cape and cowl. This was the first time the identity had been used in the main DC Universe reality. During the "Scattered Pieces" tie-in to the "Batman R.I.P." storyline, Ulysses Armstrong briefly appears as Red Robin. In 2009, a new ongoing series was introduced titled Red Robin starring Tim Drake (then under the name Tim Wayne) in the role. Drake was the third Robin before assuming the Red Robin persona.

Main continuity incarnations

Jason Todd

In Countdown to Final Crisis #14, Jason dons the outfit in the "Bat Bunker" (Earth-51's equivalent to the Batcave) as he and Earth-51 Batman join the fight raging on the Earth above the bunker. Jason keeps his new suit and identity for the rest of his tenure as a "Challenger of the Unknown", only to discard it on his return to New Earth and revert to his "Red Hood" street clothing.

At the start of Countdown, Jason Todd resumes the persona of the Red Hood and rescues a woman from Duela Dent (Two-Face's daughter). After a Monitor shoots and kills Duela, he attempts to kill Jason, but is stopped by a second Monitor. This second Monitor apologizes to Jason before they both disappear, leaving Jason alone with Duela's body. Later, at Duela's funeral, Jason hides until all of the Teen Titans have left except Donna Troy. Jason tells her what happened the night of Duela's death, and about the dueling Monitors. He knows that both he and Donna Troy have come back from the dead, and wonders which of them is next on the Monitor's hit list. The two are then attacked by the Forerunner, but before she can kill them, the apologetic Monitor stops her, and recruits Jason and Donna for a mission to the Palmerverse (a section of the Nanoverse discovered by Ray Palmer), in an attempt to find Palmer. During the trip, Jason takes it upon himself to name the Monitor "Bob". Jason seems to have a romantic interest in Donna, and is shown to be visibly disgruntled when her old boyfriend, Kyle Rayner, joins their group as they take their tour to the 52 Earths which comprise the Multiverse.

A teaser image released to promote Countdown showed a figure resembling Red Robin among assembled heroes in poses symbolic of their roles in the series. After a series of contradictory statements about this figure, executive editor Dan DiDio firmly stated in the July 2007 DC Nation column that the figure is Jason Todd; Todd, a major player in Countdown, has gone under the aliases "Red Hood" and "Robin". The Red Robin costume, originally designed by Alex Ross for the 1996 Kingdom Come limited series and worn by Dick Grayson, is seen in Countdown to Final Crisis #16 in the Earth-51 Batman's base of operations. In issue #14, Jason dons the Red Robin suit and goes into battle alongside Earth-51's Batman. During a battle with a group of Monarch's soldiers, Earth-51 Batman is killed by the Ultraman of Earth-3, deeply affecting Jason. In his grief, Jason murders an alternate version of the Joker who mocks his loss, vacating alongside Donna, Ray, and Kyle to the planet Apokolips before Earth-51's destruction. After the group is sent back to Earth, Jason leaves the group and returns to his crimefighting ways. When the Morticoccus virus is released from Karate Kid's body, Jason is forcibly brought back to the group by Kyle, much to his dismay. When the Challengers return to the true Earth, Jason disposes of his Red Robin costume and abandons the rest of the group, though they go on to declare to the monitors that they are now the monitors of the Monitors.

Ulysses Armstrong

During the Scattered Pieces tie-in to the Batman R.I.P. storyline, a new Red Robin appears, at first only as a glimmering image following Robin (Tim Drake) and suspected to have stolen a briefcase of money from the Penguin.  Tim initially suspects Jason Todd of reprising his Red Robin persona. However, Jason claims innocence, supposing that someone may have stolen his suit when he discarded it earlier.  The new Red Robin breaks up a scuffle between Tim and Jason, and later is revealed to be Ulysses Armstrong.  He has come into possession of the Red Robin costume worn by Jason Todd, and uses it as part of a campaign of psychological warfare against Tim Drake. More formidable than ever, he is revealed to be holding Lonnie Machin, a former vigilante, hostage and to have commandeered the latter's identity as "Anarky". Where Machin's approach as Anarky had been to cause social change, Armstrong's approach bordered more on psychotic and meaningless acts of chaos and destruction. Armstrong later changes costumes when he reveals himself to be the new Anarky, and after being severely burned in an explosion, an embattled Tim Drake dons the less-revealing Red Robin costume to hide his wounds (he later returns to his standard uniform).

Tim Drake

 
After Dick Grayson takes up the mantle of Batman, he gives the title of Robin to Damian Wayne, claiming that Robin is a student of Batman and that he sees Tim as an equal.  Tim begrudgingly accepts. Tim goes on to tell Spoiler that he will be leaving Gotham for an unspecified period of time. He is now the new Red Robin—an identity that is already tarnished and independent of the Bat-family—traveling the world searching for Bruce Wayne.  Meanwhile, while doing his search, Tim is being monitored by Ra's al Ghul, who appears not only interested in Tim himself, but also Tim's quest for Batman.

Tim's Red Robin costume consists of a long-sleeved red shirt or tunic, along with black boots, tights, gloves, and a black cape and cowl. It also includes a black-and-gold utility belt with other utility storage devices (similar in appearance) crossing over the chest in an "X" shape, meeting at a circular Red Robin insignia. Aside from the trademark bo staff, grapnel guns, and a customized red motorcycle for transportation, Tim also uses throwing discs (similar to batarangs, but circular and adorned with the Red Robin insignia), the latter also used by the previous wearers of the Red Robin costume. Alfred Pennyworth has slightly altered the costume while mending it after the uniform sustained significant damage after Tim's confrontation with Ra's al Ghul. The new features include a bulkier utility belt and black scalloped gloves similar to Batman's. The shirttails have been removed. Tim's new cape also happens to be a "paracape", like Dick and Damian's, which gives Tim a gliding capability when it is semi-rigid.

Red Robin eventually rejoined the Teen Titans and took over as the team's leader after Wonder Girl stepped down. In September 2011, The New 52 rebooted DC's continuity. In this new timeline, Tim is reintroduced as the leader of the Teen Titans. In DC's new relaunch, DC Rebirth, Tim will be in a team with other Bat-Family members as Red Robin in Detective Comics. The team will be led by Batman and Batwoman and will also include Spoiler, Orphan, and Clayface.

As of the Infinite Frontier relaunch, Tim Drake has returned to using the Robin identity while current Robin Damian Wayne has no official codename.

Alternative versions

Kingdom Come

In Kingdom Come, a middle-aged Dick Grayson reclaims the Robin mantle and becomes Red Robin, not at the side of his former mentor Batman, but rather with Superman's League. His uniform is closer to Batman's in design than any previous Robin uniform. Age has not slowed him down, as he possesses all of his stealth and fighting skills. In this story, he has a daughter with Starfire; Mar'i Grayson (Nightstar). At the end of the comic and the novel, Bruce and Dick had reconciled.

Teen Titans Go!
An alternate Red Robin appears in Teen Titans Go! #48. This version of Red Robin is the leader of the Teen Tyrants, a group of young supervillains from an alternate reality where all of the world's heroes are evil.

Ongoing series

With writers Chris Yost on the first three arcs and Fabian Nicieza on the rest and primary pencils by Marcus To, Red Robin features former Robin Tim Drake under the identity of Red Robin. The debut of the series follows the events of Batman R.I.P., Final Crisis, and Battle for the Cowl in which the original Batman, Bruce Wayne, apparently died at the hands of DC Comics villain Darkseid. Of all the characters in the so-called "Batman family", Tim (now technically a Wayne after his adoption by Bruce) is the only one that believes Bruce Wayne is still alive and leaves Gotham City to begin a global search for evidence supporting his theory and hope.

In other media
 A reference to Red Robin was included in the 2004–2008 cartoon series The Batman. The police of the future seen in the episode "Artifacts" believe that Bruce Wayne is the civilian identity of Robin, whom they incorrectly refer to as "Red Robin", while they think Thomas Wayne is Batman and Martha Wayne is Batgirl (incorrectly called Batwoman).
 In the animated TV series Teen Titans Go!, Robin uses the codename Red Robin on a mission.
 The Tim Drake version of Red Robin appeared in the animated film Batman Unlimited: Animal Instincts and its sequel, Batman Unlimited: Monster Mayhem, as a sidekick to Batman.
 The Red Robin costume is a DLC for Robin (Tim Drake) in the video game Batman: Arkham City.
 Red Robin appears in the handheld versions of the video game Lego Batman 2: DC Super Heroes.
 The Red Robin costume is one of four costumes available for Robin (Tim Drake) in the Young Justice: Legacy video game.
 Red Robin appears as a playable character in Lego DC Super-Villains.
 The Tim Drake incarnation of Red Robin appears as a supporting character in the movie Batman Ninja.
 The Jason Todd version of Red Robin appears in one of the alternative versions of the interactive movie Batman: Death in the Family.

References

External links

Fictional detectives
Fictional stick-fighters
Characters created by Alex Ross
Batman characters code names
Robin (character)
Vigilante characters in comics